Rose Aguilar is a progressive journalist and radio host from San Francisco, California.

Career

Radio

Since 2006, Aguilar has hosted Your Call, a daily public affairs radio show on NPR-affiliate KALW FM 91.7. Prior to becoming the show's host, Aguilar was a producer and guest host for the show. Aguilar formerly hosted the Activist Beat with Rose Aguilar, "a weekly roundup of progressive activism that the mainstream media ignores, undercovers, or misrepresents." Before joining KALW, Aguilar spent eight years as a reporter with CNET Radio, where she reported on technology's impact on society.

Author
Aguilar is the author of Red Highways: A Liberal's Journey into the Heartland, which documented a six-month road trip she took to the so-called "red states" to interview people about issues and voting tendencies. She is a contributor to the book Red State Rebels: Tales of Grassroots Resistance in the Heartland. Aguilar writes a weekly commentary for KPFK. She also writes for AlterNet and Truthout, and offers political analysis for the BBC.

Community involvement
Aguilar sits on the board of the Women's Intercultural Network (WIN), a non-profit organization working to connect girls and women across borders. She speaks about the media, women's issues, and progressive politics on panels and at conferences. Aguilar is a member of the Native American Journalists Association, San Francisco Women on the Web and Journalism and Women Symposium, and is a vegan.

References

American women bloggers
American bloggers
American feminists
21st-century American memoirists
American women memoirists
American political writers
American radio journalists
Radio personalities from San Francisco
Year of birth missing (living people)
Living people
NPR personalities
Saint Mary's College of California alumni
American women radio journalists
21st-century American women